The Wind River is a tributary of the East Fork Chandalar River in the U.S. state of Alaska. It arises in the Philip Smith Mountains of the Brooks Range and flows into the East Fork and eventually into the Yukon River.

Wind River is a National Wild and Scenic River. The main stem, headwaters, and an unnamed tributary— of streams in total—were designated "wild" in 1980. All lie within the Arctic National Wildlife Refuge.

See also
List of rivers of Alaska

References

Rivers of North Slope Borough, Alaska
Rivers of Alaska
Rivers of Yukon–Koyukuk Census Area, Alaska
Tributaries of the Yukon River
Rivers of Unorganized Borough, Alaska
Wild and Scenic Rivers of the United States